This is a list of works by Judy Blume (b. 1938).

Works

External links

Bibliographies by writer
Bibliographies of American writers

Children's literature bibliographies